The Reflection on the Ashura movement is a Persian book and a research work about the Islamic event Ashura, by the Iranian author, Rasul Jafarian. In this book, after introducing the oldest and most important historical texts related to the history of Ashura, author has examined how the origin, consequences, falsifications and rituals of the Ashura movement were formed.

Structure and content

First edition
In the first edition of the book Reflection on the Ashura movement which was published in 2001, the author Rasul Jafarian has compiled it in an introduction and twelve topics which are:

 Introduction
 About the sources of Ashura history
 Backgrounds for the Karbala Uprising
 Karbala Incident Reportage
 Another report on the Karbala incident
 Arbaʽeen of Imam Husayn (AS)
 The wisdom of the martyrdom of Imam Husayn (AS)
 Impacts of the Imam Husayn's Movement
 A review on the book Kamil al-Ziyarat of Ibn Qulawayh
 Intensification dimensions (In form and meaning) of the Imam Husayn's Movement
 Historical context of Sunni's mourning for Imam Husayn (AS)
 Falsification of Ashura
 Rowzat al-Shohada of Husayn Kashifi

Last edition
In 2020, new edition of the book Reflection on the Ashura movement was published with corrections and additions in 719 pages. This new edition contains an introduction and twenty-four topics which are:

 About this book
 About the sources of Ashura history
 Eighty-nine Al-Baladhuri narrations about Ashura
 A few points about the written heritage of Ashura
 Some backgrounds of the Karbala Uprising
 Historical report of the Karbala Incident
 Analytical report of the Karbala Incident
 Arbaʽeen of Imam Husayn (AS)
 Ashura in Shiite jurisprudence
 Karbala from narration to wisdom
 The wisdom of the martyrdom of Imam Husayn (AS)
 Investigating rational and narrative approaches to Ashura from the past to the present
 Impacts of the Imam Husayn's Movement
 A review on the book Kamil al-Ziyarat of Ibn Qulawayh
 Intensification dimensions (In form and meaning) of the Imam Husayn's Movement
 Historical context of Sunni's mourning for Imam Husayn (AS)
 Falsification of Ashura
 Rowzat al-Shohada of Husayn Kashifi
 Maqtal al-Husayn according to the narration of Hasin Ibn Abdul Rahman Solmi Kufi
 A few notes about Ashura reports in the film Hussein Who Said No
 A report of an ancient Chinese Maqtal from Karbala
 Ashura sources: from historical narration to fictional narration
 Ashura conversations (interviews with news agencies and magazines)
 Notes about Ashura 
 Molla Agha Darbandi and Maqtal writing (views, innovations and citations)

Part of the introduction
Jafarian writes in part of the book's introduction:

Critique and review
The book Reflection on the Ashura movement has been criticized and reviewed several times so far.

See also
 Atlas of Shia
 The specialized library on Islam and Iran
 Bibliography of Rasul Jafarian
 History of Islamic Iran
 Political History of Islam
 The intellectual and political life of Shia Imams
 Namira (book)
 Rijal al-Kashshi
 Understanding Islamic Sciences

References

External links
 A Study of the Semantic Reflection of Ashura Movement in Surah al-Fajr
 Rasul Jafarian - Google Scholar
 Rasul Jafarian articles in English on SID
 Rasul Jafarian English articles on Magiran

Rasul Jafarian's books
Books about Husayn ibn Ali
Iranian books